Pseudathyma neptidina, the streaked false sergeant, is a butterfly in the family Nymphalidae. It is found in Guinea, Sierra Leone, Cameroon, the Republic of the Congo, the Democratic Republic of the Congo, and Uganda. Its habitat consists of forests.

The larvae feed on Chrysophyllum oblanceolatum.

References

Butterflies described in 1894
Pseudathyma
Butterflies of Africa